Baku International School (BIS) is a school located in Baku, Azerbaijan, which was established by the Quality Schools International (QSI) group in 1994.  The school provides preschool education, elementary education, middle school, and secondary education.  The school programs are accredited by the Middle States Association of Colleges and Schools (MSA) in the United States.

As an international school, there are students from the United States, Azerbaijan, India, Poland, Greece, South Korea, Turkey, Germany, Japan, Colombia, Spain, Russia, Australia, Trinidad, and Romania.

For after-school activities, there are Boy Scouts, Girl Scouts, and ballet for preschool and elementary students.  For middle and high school students, there are sports activities such as cross country running, soccer, basketball, and track and field.

See also

 International schools in Azerbaijan
 Lycée Français de Bakou - French school in Baku

References

https://www.qsi.org/azerbaijan/azb/

External links
Baku International School | Quality Schools International official site
Quality Schools International
Azerbaijan, Baku: Baku International School." U.S. Department of State.
QSI Curriculum

International schools in Azerbaijan
Educational institutions established in 1994
1994 establishments in Azerbaijan
Schools in Baku
Quality Schools International